A tholobate (from ) or drum is the upright part of a building on which a dome is raised. It is generally in the shape of a cylinder or a polygonal prism.

In the earlier Byzantine church architecture the dome rested directly on the pendentives and the windows were pierced in the dome itself; in later examples, between the pendentive and the dome an intervening circular wall was built in which the windows were pierced. This is the type which was universally employed by the architects of the Renaissance, of whose works the best-known example is St. Peter's Basilica at Rome. Other examples of churches of this type are St Paul's Cathedral in London and the churches of the Les Invalides, the Val-de-Grâce, and the Sorbonne in Paris.

There are also secular buildings with tholobates: the United States Capitol dome in Washington, D.C. is set on a drum, as are numerous American state capitols. The Panthéon in Paris is another secular building featuring a dome on a drum. St Paul's Cathedral and the Panthéon were the two inspirations for the U.S. Capitol. In contrast, the dome of the Reichstag building in Berlin before its post-war restoration was a quadrilateral, so its tholobate was square and not round.

See also 

 Tambour
 Roof lanterns above some domes

References 

Architectural elements